Tomáš Nádašdi (born May 14, 1980) is a Slovak former professional ice hockey defenceman.

Career statistics

Regular season and playoffs

External links
 

Living people
HK Poprad players
HC Košice players
Rytíři Kladno players
Slovak ice hockey defencemen
1980 births
Sportspeople from Spišská Nová Ves
Slovak expatriate ice hockey players in the Czech Republic
Expatriate ice hockey players in Denmark
Slovak expatriate sportspeople in Denmark